Belém is a municipality located in the center of the Brazilian state of Alagoas. Its population is 4,284 (2020) and its area is 48 km².

References

Municipalities in Alagoas